Nenad Sević (born 25 April 1996) is a Serbian footballer who plays for Mladost Novi Sad.

Career

Early career
Born in Ljubovija, Sević started playing senior football with local club Drina. Playing for that club, he scored a spectacular goal from corner kick during the league cup match against Rađevac. Later he played as a bonus player for Loznica where he made some assists, and Budućnost Krušik in the Serbian League West, where he scored 2 goals on 24 matches for the 2015–16 season.

Javor Ivanjica
In summer 2016, Sević moved to Javor Ivanjica and signed a three-year contract with the club. He made his debut for new club in the first fixture of the 2016–17 season against Radnik Surdulica, played on 23 July 2016. Sević was also loaned to Kolubara for the 2016–17 Serbian First League season, on dual registration. Sević scored his first goal for Javor and was also nominated for the man of the match against Proleter Novi Sad in the first round of Serbian Cup, played on 21 September 2016.

Career statistics

Honours
Loznica
Serbian League West: 2014–15

References

External links
 
 
 

1996 births
Living people
Association football defenders
Serbian footballers
FK Loznica players
FK Budućnost Valjevo players
FK Javor Ivanjica players
FK Kolubara players
FK Zlatibor Čajetina players
Serbian SuperLiga players
Serbian First League players